Ngarkat were an indigenous Australian people of South Australia.

Ngarkat  may also refer to the following.

Ngarkat, South Australia, a locality
Ngarkat Conservation Park, a protected area in South Australia
Ngarkat Highway, a road in South Australia
Ngarkat language, a dialect of the indigenous  Australian language of Yuyu

See also
Wyperfeld, Big Desert and Ngarkat Important Bird Area